The 1999–2000 Nationalliga A season was the 62nd season of the Nationalliga A, the top level of ice hockey in Switzerland. 10 teams participated in the league, and the ZSC Lions won the championship.

Regular season

Playoffs

Quarterfinals

Semifinals

Final

Relegation

External links
 Championnat de Suisse 1999/2000 

National League (ice hockey) seasons
Swiss
1999–2000 in Swiss ice hockey